The Merger may refer to:

"The Merger" (Dilbert episode), an episode of the Dilbert TV series
"The Merger" (The Office), an episode of the American TV series The Office
The Merger (film), 2018 Australian comedy/drama film
"The Merger", an episode of Survivor: Borneo

See also
Merge (disambiguation)